The Noah Bryan Store is a historic commercial building at the southwest corner of Glade and Main Streets in Marshall, Arkansas.  It is a single-story fieldstone structure, built in a distinctive Ozark regional style in which quarry-faced stone is set at differing depths to create a rusticated and textured surface.  It was built in 1926 by Bob Hardin, a local builder, for Noah Bryan, who operated a retail store on the premises until the great depression.

The building was listed on the National Register of Historic Places in 1993.

See also 
National Register of Historic Places listings in Searcy County, Arkansas

References 

Commercial buildings on the National Register of Historic Places in Arkansas
Commercial buildings completed in 1926
Buildings and structures in Searcy County, Arkansas
National Register of Historic Places in Searcy County, Arkansas
1926 establishments in Arkansas